11B97 was a Soviet nuclear electric rocket engine developed from 1978 through 1986. It was designed with enough propellent to work for 16,000 hours and the nuclear reactor would have had three years of life. It would have been capable of moving up to 100 tonnes of mass to a geostationary orbit, but was never flown.

See also
 NERVA, the American project for nuclear thermal propulsion
 RD-0410

References

Nuclear spacecraft propulsion